The Zee Cine Critics Award - Best Actress is chosen by a jury organized by Zee Entertainment Enterprises. It is a category of Zee Cine Award for the Hindi film industry. They were instituted in November 1997 to award "Excellence in cinema - the democratic way".

They were first held in Mumbai until 2004, when the ZCA went international and had their ceremony in Dubai, and in following years in London, Mauritius, Malaysia, and London again in 2008. It was not held in 2009 and 2010, but resumed in 2011, being held in Singapore in 2012 it was held at the CotaiArena in Macao. The 2018 edition was held at MMRDA Grounds, Mumbai.

Winners

Multiple winners

See also
 Bollywood
 Cinema of India

References

Awards for actresses
International film awards
Zee Cine Awards